Vincour (feminine: Vincourová) is a surname. Notable people with the surname include:

 David Vincour (born 1984), Czech ice dancer
 Pavla Vincourová (born 1992), Czech volleyball player
 Tomáš Vincour (born 1990), Czech ice hockey player

See also
 

Czech-language surnames